Khosrow Jahanbani (27 February 1941 – 16 April 2014) was the son of Iranian general Amanullah Jahanbani and second husband of Princess Shahnaz Pahlavi.

Early life
Jahanbani was born on 27 February 1941 and was the youngest son of Iranian general Amanullah Jahanbani, great grandson of Fath Ali Shah. His mother, Helen Kasminsky, was from the Russian aristocracy in Petrograd. His grandfather served as governor of Azerbaijan. He was the younger brother of Nader Jahanbani who was executed in February 1979 after the Iranian revolution.

Personal life and death
Jahanbani and Shahnaz Pahlavi, the eldest daughter of Shah Mohammed Reza Pahlavi, became close friends in Switzerland where the former was studying arts. They married at the Iranian Embassy in Paris in February 1971. In a publication of the Islamic Republic of Iran it is argued that the marriage was not supported by Shahnaz Pahlavi's father, Shah Mohammad Reza Pahlavi.

They had two children; a son, Keykhosrow, (born 20 November 1971) and a daughter, Fawzia, (born 1973).

Jahanbani died on 16 April 2014 after combating cancer for several years.

References

External links

20th-century Iranian people
21st-century Iranian people
1941 births
2014 deaths
Exiles of the Iranian Revolution in Switzerland
Iranian emigrants to Switzerland
Iranian people of Circassian descent
Iranian people of Russian descent
Qajar princes